Manole River may refer to:

 Manole River (Bâsca Chiojdului)
 Valea lui Manole River
 Izvorul lui Manole River

See also 
 Manole (name)